In Order to Survive may refer to:
 In Order to Survive (film), a 1992 Russian action film
 In Order to Survive (album), a 1995 album by William Parker